Joseph Patrick Murphy (10 May 1895 – 25 October 1920) was a member of the Irish Republican Army who died as a result of his participation in the 1920 Cork hunger strike at Cork Gaol in 1920 during the Irish War of Independence

Background
Joe Murphy was born in Lynn, Massachusetts in the United States of America on 10 May 1895 the son of Irish parents, Timothy Murphy and Nora O'Brien, who subsequently returned home to their native Cork City when Joe was a young child. He was educated at Togher National School and on leaving school was employed by Cork County Council.

He had a keen interest in the Gaelic sports of hurling, Gaelic football and road bowling.

Irish Republican actions, hunger strike and death
Murphy joined the Irish Volunteers in 1917 and became a Volunteer in C Company, Second Battalion, Cork No.1 Brigade of which he was an active member. He was involved in numerous attacks on British police and military posts including a well publicized attack on Farran police barracks a few miles west of Cork city.

Murphy was arrested by British forces on 15 July 1920 for being in possession of a dud bomb used for throwing practice and was imprisoned in Cork County Gaol. Murphy faced a Military Tribunal but was not convicted or sentenced for any crime but was returned to Cork Gaol. On 11 August 1920 Murphy joined a large group of prisoners at the gaol on a hunger strike in conjunction with the Lord Mayor of Cork Terence McSwiney. Another Cork hunger striker Michael Fitzgerald died eight days before Murphy - 17 October 1920. Murphy and Fitzgerald's deaths occurred just before the largest hunger strike in Irish history the 1923 Irish Hunger Strikes.

Joe Murphy died after seventy-six days without food on 25 October 1920 and was buried in the republican plot at St. Finbarr's Cemetery, Cork with full military honors.   His funeral cortege was led by Volunteers carrying wreaths and the American Flag. Joe Murphy is buried next to fellow hunger striker Terence MacSwiney and the assassinated Lord Mayor of Cork Tomás Mac Curtain.

Honors and awards
In the late 1940s Cork City Council built a large new housing estate at Ballyphehane. Most of the roads in the new estate were named after prominent figures in the Irish War of Independence including local figures and one of these thoroughfares was named Joe Murphy Road in his honour as it was quite close to his home at Lower Pouladuff Road.

He was posthumously awarded the Service (1917-1921) Medal with Bar by the Lord Mayor of Cork in respect of his service during the War of Independence, some 99 years after his death at a ceremony in Cork's City Hall attended by members of the defence forces and his family on 9 May 2019.

References
 Cork Jail Memorial Souvenir (pamphlet), 1948, Cló na Laoí (The Lee Press), Cork.

1895 births
1920 deaths
Irish republicans
Irish Republican Army (1919–1922) members
People from County Cork
People from Lynn, Massachusetts
Irish prisoners who died on hunger strike